Adolfo Bernabé Zumelzú (5 January 1902 – 29 March 1973) was a football player from Argentina.

Career
Zumelzú represented the Argentina at the South American Championship 1927 and the South American Championship 1929 both won by Argentina.

Zumelzú also participated in the 1930 FIFA World Cup, where Argentina finished second behind Uruguay. He scored two goals in the tournament. He played club football for Tigre and Sportivo Palermo.

1928 Amsterdam Olympic Games 
He was part of the team sent to the 1928 Amsterdam Summer Olympics, but he did not play in any matches. Argentina lost the final against Uruguay.

International goals
Argentina's goal tally first

References

1902 births
1930 FIFA World Cup players
1973 deaths
Footballers from Buenos Aires
Argentine footballers
Club Atlético Tigre footballers
Olympic footballers of Argentina
Olympic silver medalists for Argentina
Argentine people of Basque descent
Footballers at the 1928 Summer Olympics
Argentina international footballers
Olympic medalists in football
Copa América-winning players
Medalists at the 1928 Summer Olympics
Association football wing halves